Gossypium tomentosum, commonly known as mao, huluhulu or Hawaiian cotton, is a species of cotton plant that is endemic to the Hawaiian Islands. The seed hairs (lint) are short and reddish brown, unsuitable for spinning or twisting into thread.

Genetic studies indicate that Hawaiian cotton is related to American species of Gossypium, with its closest relative Gossypium hirsutum. Its ancestor may have come to the islands from the Americas as a seed on the wind or in the droppings of a bird, or as part of floating debris.

Native Hawaiians use mao flowers to make a yellow dye.

References

External links

Gossypium tomentosum (ma'o) information from the Hawaiian Ecosystems at Risk project (HEAR)
Gossypium tomentosum (ma'o) images from Forest & Kim Starr

tomentosum
Plants described in 1865
Endemic flora of Hawaii
Flora without expected TNC conservation status